Michigan was admitted to the Union on January 26, 1837. Its current U.S. senators are Democrats Debbie Stabenow and Gary Peters. Carl Levin was Michigan's longest-serving senator (1979–2015). Four Michigan senators have risen to the position of President pro tempore, and one (Thomas W. Ferry) served as President of the Senate from November 22, 1875 to March 3, 1877 (as acting Vice President of the United States).

List of senators

|- style="height:2em"
! rowspan=2 | 1
| rowspan=2 align=left | Lucius Lyon
|  | Jacksonian
| rowspan=2 nowrap | Jan 26, 1837 –Mar 3, 1839
| rowspan=2 | Elected in 1835 but not seated until 1837 due to a territorial dispute with Ohio.Retired.
| rowspan=2 | 1
| 
| rowspan=4 | 1
| rowspan=4 | Elected in 1835 but not seated until 1837 due to a territorial dispute with Ohio.Retired.
| rowspan=4 nowrap | Jan 26, 1837 –Mar 3, 1841
|  | Jacksonian
| rowspan=4 align=right | John Norvell
! rowspan=4 | 1

|- style="height:2em"
|  | Democratic
| 
| rowspan=3  | Democratic

|- style="height:2em"
| colspan=3 | Vacant
| nowrap | Mar 4, 1839 –Jan 20, 1840
|  
| rowspan=4 | 2
| rowspan=2 

|- style="height:2em"
! rowspan=3 | 2
| rowspan=3 align=left | Augustus Porter
| rowspan=3  | Whig
| rowspan=3 nowrap | Jan 20, 1840 –Mar 3, 1845
| rowspan=3 | Elected late in 1840.Retired.

|- style="height:2em"
| 
| rowspan=3 | 2
| rowspan=3 | Elected in 1841.Retired.
| rowspan=3 nowrap | Mar 4, 1841 –Mar 3, 1847
| rowspan=3  | Whig
| rowspan=3 align=right | William Woodbridge
! rowspan=3 | 2

|- style="height:2em"
| 

|- style="height:2em"
! rowspan=2 | 3
| rowspan=2 align=left | Lewis Cass
| rowspan=2  | Democratic
| rowspan=2 nowrap | Mar 4, 1845 –May 29, 1848
| rowspan=2 | Elected in 1844 or 1845.Resigned to run for president.
| rowspan=5 | 3
| 

|- style="height:2em"
| rowspan=3 
| rowspan=5 | 3
| rowspan=5 | Elected in 1847.Retired.
| rowspan=5 nowrap | Mar 4, 1847 –Mar 3, 1853
| rowspan=5  | Democratic
| rowspan=5 align=right | Alpheus Felch
! rowspan=5 | 3

|- style="height:2em"
| colspan=3 | Vacant
| nowrap | May 29, 1848 –Jun 8, 1848
|  

|- style="height:2em"
! 4
| align=left | Thomas Fitzgerald
|  | Democratic
| nowrap | Jun 8, 1848 –Mar 3, 1849
| Appointed to continue Cass's term.

|- style="height:2em"
|- style="height:2em"
! rowspan=4 | 5
| rowspan=4 align=left nowrap | Lewis Cass
| rowspan=4  | Democratic
| rowspan=4 nowrap | Mar 4, 1849 –Mar 3, 1857
| Elected in 1849 to finish his own term.
| 

|- style="height:2em"
| rowspan=3 | Re-elected in 1850 or 1851.Retired or lost re-election.
| rowspan=3 | 4
| 

|- style="height:2em"
| 
| rowspan=3 | 4
| rowspan=3 | Elected in 1853.Retired.
| rowspan=3 nowrap | Mar 4, 1853 –Mar 3, 1859
| rowspan=3  | Democratic
| rowspan=3 align=right | Charles E. Stuart
! rowspan=3 | 4

|- style="height:2em"
| 

|- style="height:2em"
! rowspan=11 | 6
| rowspan=11 align=left | Zachariah Chandler
| rowspan=11  | Republican
| rowspan=11 nowrap | Mar 4, 1857 –Mar 3, 1875
| rowspan=5 | Elected in 1857.
| rowspan=5 | 5
| 

|- style="height:2em"
| 
| rowspan=5 | 5
| rowspan=2 | Elected in 1858.Died.
| rowspan=2 nowrap | Mar 4, 1859 –Oct 5, 1861
| rowspan=2  | Republican
| rowspan=2 align=right | Kinsley S. Bingham
! rowspan=2 | 5

|- style="height:2em"
| rowspan=3 

|- style="height:2em"
|  
| nowrap | Oct 5, 1861 –Jan 17, 1862
| colspan=3 | Vacant

|- style="height:2em"
| rowspan=2 | Elected in 1862 to finish Bingham's term.
| rowspan=5 nowrap | Jan 17, 1862 –Mar 3, 1871
| rowspan=5  | Republican
| rowspan=5 align=right | Jacob M. Howard
! rowspan=5 | 6

|- style="height:2em"
| rowspan=3 | Re-elected in 1863.
| rowspan=3 | 6
| 

|- style="height:2em"
| 
| rowspan=3 | 6
| rowspan=3 | Re-elected in 1865.Retired or lost re-election.

|- style="height:2em"
| 

|- style="height:2em"
| rowspan=3 | Re-elected in 1869.Lost re-election.
| rowspan=3 | 7
| 

|- style="height:2em"
| 
| rowspan=3 | 7
| rowspan=3 | Elected in 1871.
| rowspan=10 nowrap | Mar 4, 1871 –Mar 3, 1883
| rowspan=10  | Republican
| rowspan=10 align=right | Thomas W. Ferry
! rowspan=10 | 7

|- style="height:2em"
| 

|- style="height:2em"
! rowspan=2 | 7
| rowspan=2 align=left | Isaac P. Christiancy
| rowspan=2  | Republican
| rowspan=2 nowrap | Mar 4, 1875 –Feb 10, 1879
| rowspan=2 | Elected in 1874.Resigned due to ill health.
| rowspan=7 | 8
| 

|- style="height:2em"
| rowspan=3 
| rowspan=7 | 8
| rowspan=7 | Re-elected in 1877.Lost re-election.

|- style="height:2em"
| colspan=3 | Vacant
| nowrap | Feb 10, 1879 –Feb 22, 1879
|  

|- style="height:2em"
! rowspan=2 | 8
| rowspan=2 align=left | Zachariah Chandler
| rowspan=2  | Republican
| rowspan=2 nowrap | Feb 22, 1879 –Nov 1, 1879
| rowspan=2 | Elected in 1879 to finish Christiancy's term.Died.

|- style="height:2em"
| rowspan=3 

|- style="height:2em"
| colspan=3 | Vacant
| nowrap | Nov 1, 1879 –Nov 17, 1879
|  

|- style="height:2em"
! 9
| align=left | Henry P. Baldwin
|  | Republican
| nowrap | Nov 17, 1879 –Mar 3, 1881
| Appointed to continue Chandler's term.Elected in 1881 to finish Chandler's term.Retired.

|- style="height:2em"
! rowspan=3 | 10
| rowspan=3 align=left | Omar D. Conger
| rowspan=3  | Republican
| rowspan=3 nowrap | Mar 4, 1881 –Mar 3, 1887
| rowspan=3 | Elected in 1881.Lost renomination.
| rowspan=3 | 9
| 

|- style="height:2em"
| 
| rowspan=3 | 9
| rowspan=3 | Election year unknown.Retired.
| rowspan=3 nowrap | Mar 4, 1883 –Mar 3, 1889
| rowspan=3  | Republican
| rowspan=3 align=right | Thomas W. Palmer
! rowspan=3 | 8

|- style="height:2em"
| 

|- style="height:2em"
! rowspan=4 | 11
| rowspan=4 align=left | Francis B. Stockbridge
| rowspan=4  | Republican
| rowspan=4 nowrap | Mar 4, 1887 –Apr 30, 1894
| rowspan=3 | Elected in 1887.
| rowspan=3 | 10
| 

|- style="height:2em"
| 
| rowspan=6 | 10
| rowspan=6 | Elected in 1889.
| rowspan=10 nowrap | Mar 4, 1889 –Aug 10, 1902
| rowspan=10  | Republican
| rowspan=10 align=right | James McMillan
! rowspan=10 | 9

|- style="height:2em"
| 

|- style="height:2em"
| Re-elected in 1893.Died.
| rowspan=6 | 11
| rowspan=4 

|- style="height:2em"
| colspan=3 | Vacant
| nowrap | Apr 30, 1894 –May 5, 1894
|  

|- style="height:2em"
! 12
| align=left | John Patton Jr.
|  | Republican
| nowrap | May 5, 1894 –Jan 24, 1895
| Appointed to continue Stockbridge's term.Lost election to finish term.

|- style="height:2em"
! rowspan=13 | 13
| rowspan=13 align=left | Julius C. Burrows
| rowspan=13  | Republican
| rowspan=13 nowrap | Jan 24, 1895 –Mar 3, 1911
| rowspan=3 | Elected in 1895 to finish Stockbridge's term.

|- style="height:2em"
| 
| rowspan=3 | 11
| rowspan=3 | Re-elected in 1895.

|- style="height:2em"
| 

|- style="height:2em"
| rowspan=5 | Re-elected in 1899.
| rowspan=5 | 12
| 

|- style="height:2em"
| rowspan=3 
| rowspan=7 | 12
| Re-elected in 1901.Died.

|- style="height:2em"
|  
| nowrap | Aug 10, 1902 –Sep 27, 1902
| colspan=3 | Vacant

|- style="height:2em"
| rowspan=3 | Appointed to continue McMillan's term.Elected in 1903 to finish McMillan's term.Died.
| rowspan=3 nowrap | Sep 27, 1902 –Jan 24, 1907
| rowspan=3  | Republican
| rowspan=3 align=right | Russell A. Alger
! rowspan=3 | 10

|- style="height:2em"
| 

|- style="height:2em"
| rowspan=5 | Re-elected in 1905.Lost renomination.
| rowspan=5 | 13
| rowspan=3 

|- style="height:2em"
|  
| nowrap | Jan 24, 1907 –Feb 9, 1907
| colspan=3 | Vacant

|- style="height:2em"
| Elected in 1907 to finish Alger's term, having already been elected to the next term.
| rowspan=7 nowrap | Feb 9, 1907 –Mar 3, 1919
| rowspan=7  | Republican
| rowspan=7 align=right | William A. Smith
! rowspan=7 | 11

|- style="height:2em"
| 
| rowspan=3 | 13
| rowspan=3 | Elected in 1907.

|- style="height:2em"
| 

|- style="height:2em"
! rowspan=8 | 14
| rowspan=8 align=left | Charles E. Townsend
| rowspan=8  | Republican
| rowspan=8 nowrap | Mar 4, 1911 –Mar 3, 1923
| rowspan=3 | Elected in 1911.
| rowspan=3 | 14
| 

|- style="height:2em"
| 
| rowspan=3 | 14
| rowspan=3 | Re-elected in 1913.Retired.

|- style="height:2em"
| 

|- style="height:2em"
| rowspan=5 | Re-elected in 1916.Lost re-election.
| rowspan=5 | 15
| 

|- style="height:2em"
| 
| rowspan=5 | 15
| rowspan=2 | Elected in 1918.Resigned.
| rowspan=2 nowrap | Mar 4, 1919 –Nov 18, 1922
| rowspan=2  | Republican
| rowspan=2 align=right | Truman H. Newberry
! rowspan=2 | 12

|- style="height:2em"
| rowspan=3 

|- style="height:2em"
|  
| nowrap | Nov 18, 1922 –Nov 29, 1922
| colspan=3 | Vacant

|- style="height:2em"
| rowspan=2 | Appointed to continue Newberry's term.Elected in 1924 to finish Newberry's term.
| rowspan=10 nowrap | Nov 29, 1922 –Oct 22, 1936
| rowspan=10  | Republican
| rowspan=10 align=right | James J. Couzens
! rowspan=10 | 13

|- style="height:2em"
! rowspan=3 | 15
| rowspan=3 align=left | Woodbridge N. Ferris
| rowspan=3  | Democratic
| rowspan=3 nowrap | Mar 4, 1923 –Mar 23, 1928
| rowspan=3 | Elected in 1922.Died.
| rowspan=5 | 16
| 

|- style="height:2em"
| 
| rowspan=5 | 16
| rowspan=5 | Re-elected in 1924.

|- style="height:2em"
| rowspan=3 

|- style="height:2em"
| colspan=3 | Vacant
| nowrap | Mar 23, 1928 –Mar 31, 1928
|  

|- style="height:2em"
! rowspan=15 | 16
| rowspan=15 align=left | Arthur Vandenberg
| rowspan=15  | Republican
| rowspan=15 nowrap | Mar 31, 1928 –Apr 18, 1951
| Appointed to continue Ferris's term.Elected in 1928 to finish Ferris's term.

|- style="height:2em"
| rowspan=3 | Elected in 1928.
| rowspan=3 | 17
| 

|- style="height:2em"
| 
| rowspan=5 | 17
| rowspan=3 | Re-elected in 1930.Died.

|- style="height:2em"
| 

|- style="height:2em"
| rowspan=5 | Re-elected in 1934.
| rowspan=5 | 18
| rowspan=3 

|- style="height:2em"
|  
| nowrap | Oct 22, 1936 –Nov 19, 1936
| colspan=3 | Vacant

|- style="height:2em"
| Appointed to finish Couzens's term, having already been elected to the next term.
| rowspan=4 nowrap | Nov 19, 1936 –Jan 3, 1943
| rowspan=4  | Democratic
| rowspan=4 align=right | Prentiss M. Brown
! rowspan=4 | 14

|- style="height:2em"
| 
| rowspan=3 | 18
| rowspan=3 | Elected in 1936.Lost re-election.

|- style="height:2em"
| 

|- style="height:2em"
| rowspan=3 | Re-elected in 1940.
| rowspan=3 | 19
| 

|- style="height:2em"
| 
| rowspan=3 | 19
| rowspan=3 | Elected in 1942.
| rowspan=9 nowrap | Jan 3, 1943 –Jan 3, 1955
| rowspan=9  | Republican
| rowspan=9 align=right | Homer S. Ferguson
! rowspan=9 | 15

|- style="height:2em"
| 

|- style="height:2em"
| rowspan=3 | Re-elected in 1946.Died.
| rowspan=6 | 20
| 

|- style="height:2em"
| 
| rowspan=6 | 20
| rowspan=6 | Re-elected in 1948.Lost re-election.

|- style="height:2em"
| rowspan=4 

|- style="height:2em"
| colspan=3 | Vacant
| nowrap | Apr 18, 1951 –Apr 23, 1951
|  

|- style="height:2em"
! 17
| align=left | Blair Moody
|  | Democratic
| nowrap | Apr 23, 1951 –Nov 4, 1952
| Appointed to continue Vandenberg's term.Lost election to finish term.

|- style="height:2em"
! rowspan=4 | 18
| rowspan=4 align=left | Charles E. Potter
| rowspan=4  | Republican
| rowspan=4 nowrap | Nov 5, 1952 –Jan 3, 1959
| Elected in 1952 to finish Vandenberg's term.

|- style="height:2em"
| rowspan=3 | Elected to full term in 1952.Lost re-election.
| rowspan=3 | 21
| 

|- style="height:2em"
| 
| rowspan=3 | 21
| rowspan=3 | Elected in 1954.
| rowspan=6 nowrap | Jan 3, 1955 –Apr 30, 1966
| rowspan=6  | Democratic
| rowspan=6 align=right | Patrick V. McNamara
! rowspan=6 | 16

|- style="height:2em"
| 

|- style="height:2em"
! rowspan=11 | 19
| rowspan=11 align=left | Philip Hart
| rowspan=11  | Democratic
| rowspan=11 nowrap | Jan 3, 1959 –Dec 26, 1976
| rowspan=3 | Elected in 1958.
| rowspan=3 | 22
| 

|- style="height:2em"
| 
| rowspan=5 | 22
| rowspan=3 | Re-elected in 1960.Died.

|- style="height:2em"
| 

|- style="height:2em"
| rowspan=5 | Re-elected in 1964.
| rowspan=5 | 23
| rowspan=3 

|- style="height:2em"
|  
| nowrap | Apr 30, 1966 –May 11, 1966
| colspan=3 | Vacant

|- style="height:2em"
| Appointed to finish McNamara's term.
| rowspan=9 nowrap | May 11, 1966 –Jan 3, 1979
| rowspan=9  | Republican
| rowspan=9 align=right | Robert P. Griffin
! rowspan=9 | 17

|- style="height:2em"
| 
| rowspan=3 | 23
| rowspan=3 | Elected to full term in 1966

|- style="height:2em"
| 

|- style="height:2em"
| rowspan=3 | Re-elected in 1970.Died, having already planned to retire.
| rowspan=5 | 24
| 

|- style="height:2em"
| 
| rowspan=5 | 24
| rowspan=5 | Re-elected in 1972.Lost re-election.

|- style="height:2em"
| rowspan=3 

|- style="height:2em"
| colspan=3 | Vacant
| nowrap | Dec 26, 1976 –Dec 30, 1976
|  

|- style="height:2em"
! rowspan=10 | 20
| rowspan=10 align=left | Donald Riegle
| rowspan=10  | Democratic
| rowspan=10 nowrap | Dec 30, 1976 –Jan 3, 1995
| Appointed early to finish Hart's term, having already been elected to the next term.

|- style="height:2em"
| rowspan=3 | Elected in 1976
| rowspan=3 | 25
| 

|- style="height:2em"
| 
| rowspan=3 | 25
| rowspan=3 | Elected in 1978.
| rowspan=18 nowrap | Jan 3, 1979 –Jan 3, 2015
| rowspan=18  | Democratic
| rowspan=18 align=right | Carl Levin
! rowspan=18 | 18

|- style="height:2em"
| 

|- style="height:2em"
| rowspan=3 | Re-elected in 1982.
| rowspan=3 | 26
| 

|- style="height:2em"
| 
| rowspan=3 | 26
| rowspan=3 | Re-elected in 1984.

|- style="height:2em"
| 

|- style="height:2em"
| rowspan=3 | Re-elected in 1988.Retired.
| rowspan=3 | 27
| 

|- style="height:2em"
| 
| rowspan=3 | 27
| rowspan=3 | Re-elected in 1990.

|- style="height:2em"
| 

|- style="height:2em"
! rowspan=3 | 21
| rowspan=3 align=left | Spencer Abraham
| rowspan=3  | Republican
| rowspan=3 nowrap | Jan 3, 1995 –Jan 3, 2001
| rowspan=3 | Elected in 1994.Lost re-election.
| rowspan=3 | 28
| 

|- style="height:2em"
| 
| rowspan=3 | 28
| rowspan=3 | Re-elected in 1996.

|- style="height:2em"
| 

|- style="height:2em"
! rowspan=12 | 22
| rowspan=12 align=left | Debbie Stabenow
| rowspan=12  | Democratic
| rowspan=12 nowrap | Jan 3, 2001 –Present
| rowspan=3 | Elected in 2000.
| rowspan=3 | 29
| 

|- style="height:2em"
| 
| rowspan=3 | 29
| rowspan=3 | Re-elected in 2002.

|- style="height:2em"
| 

|- style="height:2em"
| rowspan=3 | Re-elected in 2006.
| rowspan=3 | 30
| 

|- style="height:2em"
| 
| rowspan=3 | 30
| rowspan=3 | Re-elected in 2008.Retired.

|- style="height:2em"
| 

|- style="height:2em"
| rowspan=3 | Re-elected in 2012.
| rowspan=3 | 31
| 

|- style="height:2em"
| 
| rowspan=3 | 31
| rowspan=3 | Elected in 2014.
| rowspan=6 nowrap | Jan 3, 2015 –Present
| rowspan=6  | Democratic
| rowspan=6 align=right | Gary Peters
! rowspan=6 | 19

|- style="height:2em"
| 

|- style="height:2em"
| rowspan=3 | Re-elected in 2018.
Retiring at the end of term.
| rowspan=3 | 32
| 

|- style="height:2em"
| 
| rowspan=3 | 32
| rowspan=3 |Re-elected in 2020.

|- style="height:2em"
| 

|- style="height:2em"
| rowspan=2 colspan=5 | To be determined in the 2024 election.
| rowspan=2 |33
| 

|- style="height:2em"
| 
| 33
| colspan=5 | To be determined in the 2026 election.

See also

 United States congressional delegations from Michigan
 List of United States representatives from Michigan
 Elections in Michigan

References 

 
United States Senators
Michigan